Psammitis is a genus of crab spiders first described by Anton Menge in 1876.

Species
 it contains thirty-two species:
Psammitis abramovi (Marusik & Logunov, 1995) — Turkey, Iran, Tajikistan
Psammitis albidus (Grese, 1909) — Northern Europe, Russia (Europe, Siberia, Far East)
Psammitis bonneti (Denis, 1938) — France, Italy, Austria, Bulgaria, Russia (Urals to South Siberia), Kazakhstan
Psammitis courti (Marusik & Omelko, 2014) — China
Psammitis daisetsuzanus (Ono, 1988) — Japan
Psammitis deichmanni (Sørensen, 1898) — Canada, USA (Alaska), Greenland
Psammitis demirsoyi (Demir, Topçu & Türkes, 2006) — Turkey
Psammitis gobiensis (Marusik & Logunov, 2002) — Russia (South Siberia), Mongolia, China
Psammitis labradorensis (Keyserling, 1887) — North America, Greenland
Psammitis laticeps (Bryant, 1933) — USA, Cuba
Psammitis lindbergi (Roewer, 1962) — Afghanistan
Psammitis minor (Charitonov, 1946) — Central Asia
Psammitis nenilini (Marusik, 1989) — Russia (Middle and South Siberia), Mongolia, China
Psammitis nepalhimalaicus (Ono, 1978) — Nepal
Psammitis nevadensis (Keyserling, 1880) — USA
Psammitis ninnii (Thorell, 1872) — Europe, Turkey, Caucasus, Russia (Europe to South Siberia), Central Asia
Psammitis n. fusciventris (Crome, 1965) — Eastern Europe to Mongolia
Psammitis novokhatskyii (Fomichev, 2015) — Russia (Altai)
Psammitis potamon (Ono, 1978) — Nepal
Psammitis rugosus (Buckle & Redner, 1964) — Russia (Middle Siberia to Far East), Canada, USA
Psammitis sabulosus (Hahn, 1832) — Europe, North Africa, Turkey, Caucasus, Russia (Europe to Middle Siberia), Afghanistan
Psammitis s. occidentalis (Kulczyński, 1916) — France
Psammitis secedens (L. Koch, 1876) — Alps (Austria, Italy), Macedonia
Psammitis seserlig (Logunov & Marusik, 1994) — Russia (South Siberia, Far East), Mongolia
Psammitis setiger (O. Pickard-Cambridge, 1885) — Pakistan, India
Psammitis sibiricus (Kulczyński, 1908) — Russia (Middle Siberia to Far East), China
Psammitis simplicipalpatus (Ono, 1978) — Nepal, Bhutan
Psammitis torsivus (Tang & Song, 1988) — China
Psammitis tyshchenkoi (Marusik & Logunov, 1995) — Central Asia
Psammitis wuae (Song & Zhu, 1995) — China
Psammitis xysticiformis (Caporiacco, 1935) — Central Asia, China
Psammitis zonshteini (Marusik, 1989) — Kyrgyzstan, Tajikistan

References

Araneomorphae genera
Thomisidae